This is the discography of Japanese rock artist, Joe Inoue.

Albums

Studio albums

Extended plays

Singles

Digital singles

Music videos

Appearances

Compilations 
 White Out 4: Real Snowboarder's Compilation - December 9, 2007
 Track 3: "Kakusei"
 Best Hit: Naruto - July 14, 2010
 Track 5: "Closer"

Featured vocals 
 RYUKYUDISKO's pleasure - September 23, 2009
 Track 6: "OK Sampler"
 TETSUYA's Come On! - January 5, 2011
 Track 5: "Eden"
 TOTALFAT's "World of Glory with Joe Inoue" - May 4, 2011
 Track 1: "World of Glory with Joe Inoue"
 Track 2: "Don't Cry!! with Joe Inoue"
 TOTALFAT's Damn Hero - May 25, 2011
 Track 5: "World of Glory with Joe Inoue (Damn Hero Ver.)"

References

External links 
 Official Japanese website 
 Official English website

Discographies of Japanese artists